Valeriy Volodymyrovych Saratov (born 31 July 1953, in Roshal, Moscow Oblast, Russia), was a Ukrainian politician who was under a suspicion of state treason in favor for the Russian Federation.

In 2010-11 he served as a Governor of Sevastopol.

References

External links
 Osypenko, D. ''"Former" cannot be allowed to the Sevastopol city government, - Valeriy Saratov. 18 March 2014 («Бывших» нельзя пускать во власть Севастополя,- Валерий Саратов, 18 марта 2014 года). ForPost. 13 December 2015. 
 Valeriy Saratov at the ForPost
 Saratov Valery Volodymyrovych at the Dovidka: Ukraine official today

1953 births
2015 deaths
People from Moscow Oblast
Russian emigrants to Ukraine
Naturalized citizens of Ukraine
Sevastopol National Technical University alumni
Party of Regions politicians
Governors of Sevastopol (Ukraine)
People of the annexation of Crimea by the Russian Federation
Russian expatriates in Ukraine
Ukrainian defectors
Pro-Russian people of the 2014 pro-Russian unrest in Ukraine